The Cohens and Kellys is a 1926 American silent comedy film directed by  Harry A. Pollard and starring Charles Murray, George Sidney, Kate Price, and Jason Robards Sr. The film is the first of the Cohens and Kellys film serials. The film is perhaps best known today as the subject of Nichols v. Universal Pictures Corp., a copyright infringement case, in which Judge Learned Hand articulated the doctrine that copyright protection does not cover the characteristics of stock characters in a story.

Plot
As articulated in the Nichols case,

The characters were similar to those in the Nichols play, Abie's Irish Rose which was made into a film in 1928 and in 1946.

Cast

Preservation status
In addition to a worn Universal Show-at-Home copy, the film exists in two film archives, Cinematheque Royale de Belgique in Brussels and the Museum of Modern Art in New York. An excellent print with French and Dutch intertitles, with English ones apparently overlaid, was screened on April 20, 2016, at the Museum of Jewish Heritage in Manhattan. As French and Dutch are the official languages of bi-lingual Belgium, this undoubtedly was the print just referenced in an archive.

Related films
The Cohens and Kellys was the first in a series of films featuring characters from the Cohen and Kelly families.  It was followed by The Cohens and the Kellys in Paris (1928), The Cohens and Kellys in Atlantic City (1929), The Cohens and the Kellys in Scotland (1930), The Cohens and the Kellys in Africa (1930), The Cohens and Kellys in Hollywood (1932), and The Cohens and Kellys in Trouble (1933).

It was an early production of Edward Small.

References

External links

 

Lobby poster

 
1926 films
1926 comedy films
Silent American comedy films
American black-and-white films
1920s English-language films
Films about feuds
Films set in New York (state)
Universal Pictures films
Films directed by Harry A. Pollard
Films produced by Edward Small
American silent feature films
1920s American films